Transmembrane protease, serine 2 is an enzyme that in humans is encoded by the TMPRSS2 gene. It belongs to the TMPRSS family of proteins, whose members are transmembrane proteins which have a serine protease activity. These proteins often consist of an N-terminal intracellular domain, a C-terminal protease domain, a transmembrane domain and a variable extracellular stem region that constitutes the characterization of the protein. The TMPRSS2 protein is found in high concentration in the cell membranes of epithelial cells of the lung and of the prostate, but also in the heart, liver and gastrointestinal tract.

Mutations of the TMPRSS2 gene are often involved in prostate cancer. Several viruses, including SARS-CoV-2, use the protease activity of the TMPRSS2 protein in the process of entering cells.

Function 
The TMPRSS2 gene encodes a protein that belongs to the serine protease family. The encoded protein contains a type II transmembrane domain, a receptor class A domain, a scavenger receptor cysteine-rich domain and a protease domain. Serine proteases are known to be involved in many physiological and pathological processes. This gene is up-regulated by androgenic hormones in prostate cancer cells and down-regulated in androgen-independent prostate cancer tissue. The protease domain of this protein is thought to be cleaved and secreted into cell media after autocleavage. TMPRSS2 participates in proteolytic cascades necessary for normal physiological function of the prostate. Gene knockout mice lacking TMPRSS2 show no abnormalities.

Clinical significance

In prostate cancer 

TMPRSS2 protein's function in prostate carcinogenesis relies on overexpression of ETS transcription factors, such as ERG and ETV1, through gene fusion. TMPRSS2-ERG fusion gene is the most frequent, present in 40% - 80% of prostate cancers in humans. ERG overexpression contributes to development of androgen-independence in prostate cancer through disruption of androgen receptor signaling.

Coronaviruses 
Some coronaviruses, e.g. SARS-CoV-1, MERS-CoV, and SARS-CoV-2 (before the omicron variant), are activated by TMPRSS2 and can thus be inhibited by TMPRSS2 inhibitors. SARS-CoV-2 uses the SARS-CoV receptor ACE2 for entry and the serine protease TMPRSS2 for S protein priming.

Cleavage of the SARS-CoV-2 S2 spike protein required for viral entry into cells can be accomplished by proteases TMPRSS2 located on the cell membrane, or by cathepsins (primarily cathepsin L) in endolysosomes. Hydroxychloroquine inhibits the action of cathepsin L in endolysosomes, but because cathepsin L cleavage is minor compared to TMPRSS2 cleavage, hydroxychloroquine does little to inhibit SARS-CoV-2 infection.

The enzyme Adam17 has similar ACE2 cleavage activity as TMPRSS2, but by forming soluble ACE2, Adam17 may actually have the protective effect of blocking circulating SARS‑CoV‑2 virus particles. By not releasing soluble ACE2, TMPRSS2 cleavage is more harmful.

A TMPRSS2 inhibitor such as camostat approved for clinical use blocked entry and might constitute a treatment option.  Another experimental candidate as a TMPRSS2 inhibitor for potential use against both influenza and coronavirus infections in general, including those prior to the advent of COVID-19, is the overt-the-counter (in most countries) mucolytic cough medicine bromhexine, which is also being investigated as a possible treatment for COVID-19 itself as well. The fact that TMPRSS2 has no known irreplaceable function makes it a promising target for preventing SARS-CoV-2 virus transmission.

The fact that severe illness and death from Sars-Cov-2 is more common in males than females, and that TMPRSS2 is expressed several times more highly in prostate epithelium than any tissue, suggests a role for TMPRSS2 in the gender difference. Prostate cancer patients receiving androgen deprivation therapy have a lower risk of SARS-CoV-2 infection than those not receiving that therapy.

Inhibitors 
Camostat is an inhibitor of the serine protease activity of TMPRSS2. It is used to treat pancreatitis and reflux esophagitis. It was found not to be effective against COVID-19. A novel inhibitor of TMPRSS2 has been found to be effective against SARS-CoV-2 infection in cell and animal models.

References

Further reading